Jane Plackett (born 28 March 1955) is a British former professional tennis player.

Plackett, born in Liverpool, was educated at Newcastle's Church High School and is the daughter of Robin Plackett, a professor of statistics at Newcastle University. An under-14s national finalist, Plackett is a product of the Northumberland club in Newcastle and didn't take up full-time tennis until she completed her tertiary studies at London University.

Originally a Northumberland player, Plackett represented Middlesex at county level after moving down to London.

While competing on the professional tour she twice made the second round at Wimbledon in doubles. Her title wins included the Surrey Hard Court Championships and the South Island Open in New Zealand.

References

External links
 

1955 births
Living people
British female tennis players
English female tennis players
Tennis people from Tyne and Wear
Sportspeople from Newcastle upon Tyne
Sportspeople from Liverpool
Alumni of the University of London